New Lancaster is an unincorporated community in Miami County, Kansas, United States.  It is part of the Kansas City metropolitan area.

History
A post office was opened in New Lancaster in 1859, and remained in operation until it was discontinued in 1906. 

New Lancaster General store is the oldest continuing shop in Miami County.

References

Further reading

External links

 Miami County maps: Current, Historic, KDOT

Unincorporated communities in Miami County, Kansas
Unincorporated communities in Kansas